This article is a description of the morphology, syntax, and semantics of Korean. For phonetics and phonology, see Korean phonology. See also Korean honorifics, which play a large role in the grammar.

Note on romanization 

This article uses a form of Yale romanization to illustrate the morphology of Korean words. The Yale system is different from the Revised Romanization of Korean seen with place names.

Under the version of Yale used here, morphemes are written according to their underlying form rather than their spelling in the Korean writing system or pronunciation. To avoid confusion, bold type will represent the morphology (in Yale), and italics will represent Revised Romanization.

Classification of words 

The modern standard of word classification and the one taught in public schools was chosen by South Korea's 1963 Committee on Education. This is the 9 pumsa system, which divides words into nine categories called pumsa.

The 품사(品詞) pumsa, also called 씨 ssi, are themselves grouped together according to the following outline.

Content words
Substantives
(名詞) myeongsa /  ireumssi (nouns)
(代名詞) daemyeongsa /  dae-ireumssi (pronouns)
(數詞) susa /  semssi (number words)
Verbs (broadly speaking)
(動詞) dongsa /  umjikssi (action verbs)
(形容詞) hyeongyongsa /  geurimssi (descriptive verbs or adjectives)
Modifiers
(冠形詞) gwanhyeongsa /  maegimssi (determiners, prenouns, or indeclinable adjectives)
(副詞) busa /  eojjissi (adverbs)
Other content words
(感歎詞) gamtansa /  neukkimssi (interjections or exclamations)
Function words
(助詞) josa /  tossi (particles or postpositions)

Both cardinal and ordinal numbers are grouped into their own part of speech.  Descriptive verbs and action verbs are classified separately despite sharing essentially the same conjugation. Verb endings constitute a large and rich class of morphemes, indicating such things in a sentence as tense, mood, aspect, speech level (of which there are 7 in Korean), and honorifics.  Prefixes and suffixes are numerous, partly because Korean is an agglutinative language.

There are also various other important classes of words and morphemes that are not generally classified among the pumsa. 5 other major classes of words or morphemes are:

(語尾) eomi (verb endings)
(指示語) jisieo / (demonstratives)
(接續語) jeopsogeo (conjunctions)
(接頭語) jeopdueo (prefixes)
(接尾語) jeommieo (suffixes)

Substantives

Postpositions 

, josa (also called  tossi) are Korean postpositions, also known as case markers. Postpositions come after substantives and are used to indicate the role (subject, object, complement, or topic) of a noun in a sentence or clause. For a larger list, see wikt:Category:Korean particles.

Case clitics 
Case clitics ( gyeok-josa) are clitics that mark the grammatical function of the word. Both nouns and pronouns take case clitics. Pronouns are somewhat irregular. As with many clitics and suffixes in Korean, for many case clitics different forms are used with nouns ending in consonants and nouns ending in vowels. The most extreme example of this is in the nominative (subject), where the historical clitic i  is now restricted to appearing after consonants, and a completely unrelated (suppletive) form ga appears after vowels.

 nominative –  i/ga for the subject,  kkeseo for the subject who is respected
 genitive –  ui
 locative –  e "to" place or "in" place (e.g. "go to the hospital" or "I am in the hospital")
 locative 2 –  eseo "at" place or "from" place (e.g. "I work at the hospital" or "I came from Korea")
 dative –  ege "to" someone,  hante "to" someone in a casual manner,  kke "to" someone who is respected
 ablative –  egeseo "from" someone,  hanteseo "from" someone in a casual manner
 accusative –  eul/reul for the direct object
 lative –  ro/euro "onto" something or "with" something (e.g. "it is moving toward the city" or "I wrote with a pen")
 instrumental –  rosseo/eurosseo "with" something
 essive –  roseo/euroseo being "as" something (e.g. "as a teacher, I will help you")
 ablative 2 –  robuteo/eurobuteo something "from" source or origin (e.g. "modern cars are developed from carriages")
 comitative –  wa/gwa,  rang/irang,  hago together "with" someone or something
 vocative –  a/ya,  yeo/iyeo "hey" someone being addressed

Informational clitics 
Informational clitics ( bo-josa) provide additional meanings to the words that they attach to. They may override the case clitics, or be placed after other clitics.

* The topic and additive markers mark the noun phrase with case markers. They override the nominative and accusative case markers rather than being attached after those case markers.

Nouns 

Korean nouns  myeongsa (also called  ireumssi) do not have grammatical gender, and though they can be made plural by adding the suffix  deul to the end of the word, in general the suffix is not used when the plurality of the noun is clear from context. For example, while the English sentence "there are three apples" would use the plural "apples" instead of the singular "apple", the Korean sentence  Sagwaga se gae itseumnida "(lit.) apple three(things) exist" keeps the word  sagwa "apple" in its unmarked form, as the numeral makes the plural marker redundant. As Korean is a language with no grammatical gender, nouns do not have to agree with verbs. The only agreement needed for Korean nouns would be the object and subject particles (이/가, 을/를, 은/는) added depending on if the noun ends in a vowel or consonant. 

The most basic, fundamental Korean vocabulary is native to the Korean language, e.g.  nara "country",  nal "day". However, a large body of Korean nouns stem from the Korean pronunciation of Chinese characters e.g.  san "mountain",  yeok "station",  munhwa "culture", etc. Many Sino-Korean words have native Korean equivalents and vice versa, but not all. The choice of whether to use a Sino-Korean noun or a native Korean word is a delicate one, with the Sino-Korean alternative often sounding more profound or refined. It is in much the same way that Latin- or French-derived words in English are used in higher-level vocabulary sets (e.g. the sciences), thus sounding more refined – for example, the native Germanic "ask" versus Romance "inquire".

Pronouns 

Korean pronouns  daemyeongsa (also called  dae-ireumssi) are highly influenced by the honorifics in the language. Pronouns change forms depending on the social status of the person or persons spoken to, e.g. for the first person singular pronoun "I" there are both the informal  na and the honorific/humble  jeo. In general, second-person singular pronouns are avoided, especially when using honorific forms. Third-person pronouns are not well developed, and in most cases, a demonstrative  geu "that" in combination with a noun such as  saram "person" or  geot "thing" is used to fill the gap. Also, only for translation and creative writing, a newly coined term,  geu-nyeo (literally, "that woman"), is used aphoristically to refer to a female third person. A gender-neutral third person is covered by the demonstrative  geu (originally "that"). For a larger list of Korean pronouns, see wikt:Category:Korean pronouns.

Numerals 

Korean numerals  susa (also called  semssi) include two regularly used sets: a native Korean set and a Sino-Korean set. The Sino-Korean system is nearly entirely based on the Chinese numerals. The distinction between the two numeral systems is very important. Everything that can be counted will use one of the two systems, but seldom both. The grouping of large numbers in Korean follows the Chinese tradition of myriads (10,000) rather than thousands (1,000) as is common in Europe and North America.

Verbs (broadly speaking)

Processual verbs 

Korean  dongsa (also called  umjikssi) which include  sseuda "to use" and  gada "to go", are usually called, simply, "verbs." However, they can also be called "action verbs" or "dynamic verbs," because they describe an action, process, or movement. This distinguishes them from  hyeongyongsa.

Korean verb conjugation depends upon the tense, aspect, mood, and the social relation between the speaker, the subject(s), and the listener(s). Different endings are used depending on the speaker's relation with their subject or audience. Politeness is a critical part of the Korean language and Korean culture; the correct verb ending must be chosen to indicate the proper degree of respect or familiarity for the situation.

Descriptive verbs 

 hyeongyongsa (also called  geurimssi), sometimes translated as "adjectives" but also known as "descriptive verbs" or "stative verbs", are verbs such as  yeppeuda, "to be pretty" or  bukda, "to be red". English does not have an identical grammatical category, and the English translation of a Korean hyeongyongsa is usually a linking verb + an English adjective. However, some Korean words which do not match that formula, such as  aswipda, a transitive verb which means "to lack" or "to want for", are still considered hyeongyongsa in Korean because they match the conjugation pattern for adjectives. For a larger list, see wikt:Category:Korean adjectives.

Copulative and existential verbs
The predicate marker  (i-ta, ida, "to be") serves as the copula, which links the subject with its complement, that is, the role 'to be' plays in English. For example,  (Taynamwu-nun phwul-i-ta, Daenamuneun purida, "A bamboo is a grass") When the complement, which is suffixed by i-ta, ends in a vowel, i-ta contracts into -ta quite often as in following example,  (Wuli-nun chinkwu-ta, Urineun chinguda, "We are friends.") The past tense of 이다 is 이었다 (i-ess-ta, ieotda, "was"). However, if it is attached after a vowel, it is always contracted into 였다 (yess-ta, yeotda, "was"). If not, it cannot be contracted.

To negate, a special adjective  (ani-ta, anida, "to not be") is used, being one of the two cases that take complement, the other being  (toy-ta, doeda). Two nouns take the nominative clitic  (i/ka, i/ga) before the negative copula; one is the subject, and the other is the complement. The derived form  (aniyo, aniyo) is the word for "no" when answering a positive question.

 and  become  (i-ya, iya), often  (ya, ya) after a vowel and 아니야/아냐 (ani-ya/anya, aniya/anya) at the end of the sentence in 해체 (haeche, "informal, non-polite speech level") form. In 해요체 (haeyoche. "informal, polite speech level") form, they become  (i-ey-yo, ieyo), often  (yey-yo, yeyo) after a vowel and 아니에요/아녜요 (ani-ey-yo/anyey-yo, anieyo/anyeyo) as well as the less common forms  (i-e-yo/ye-yo, ieoyo/yeoyo) and 아니어요/아녀요 (ani-e-yo/anye-yo, anieoyo/anyeoyo).

The copula is only for "to be" in the sense of "A is B".

Supporting verbs/adjectives
Sometimes, just using an adverb is insufficient to express the exact meaning the speaker has in mind. The composition of a main verb (or adjective) and a supporting verb (or adjective) can be used in this case, alongside some grammatical features. Suffixes including  -a/eo,  -ge,  -ji, and  -go are taken by the main verb (or adjective), and the supporting verb (or a.) follows it and is conjugated.

Examples using -eo/a
  -a/eo gada/oda: to continue to do, while getting away/closer
  -a/eo beolida: to end up doing (and I feel sad, or distressed, to see the result)
  -a/eo boda: to try doing
  -a/eo jida (written without a space): to be done; to become adj.
  -a/eo hada (written without a space): to feel adj.

Examples using -ge
  -ge doeda: to be done; to end up doing
  -ge hada: to make sb do

Examples using -ji
  -ji anta, ( -ji anihada,  -janhda): not to do; not to be adj.
  -ji malda: not to do (in imperative, e.g.  "Don't do that!")
  -ji motada: to be unable to do

Examples using -go
  -go boda: to do before realizing sth
  -go sipda: to want to do
  -go itda: to be doing

Examples using other suffixes
  -eoya hada/doeda: to have to do
  -ado doeda: to be permitted to do
  -(eu)myeon hada: to hope to do
  -(eu)myeon doeda: to be okay or desirable to do

Modifiers

Determinatives 

Korean  gwanhyeongsa (also called  maegimssi) are known in English as "determiners," "determinatives," "pre-nouns," "adnouns," "attributives," "unconjugated adjectives," and "indeclinable adjectives." Gwanhyeongsa come before and modify or specify nouns, much like attributive adjectives or articles in English. Examples include  gak, "each." Determiners also negate the use of pronouns in day to day sentences which also makes Korean a more ambiguous and context driven language. For a larger list, see wikt:Category:Korean determiners.

Adverbs 

Korean adverbs  busa (also called  eojjissi) include  tto "again" and  gadeuk "fully". Busa, like adverbs in English, modifies verbs. For a larger list, see wikt:Category:Korean adverbs.

Other content words

Exclamations 

Korean interjections  gamtansa (also called  neukkimssi) as are also known in English as "exclamations". Examples include  ani "not". For a larger list, see wikt:Category:Korean interjections.

Sentence structure
Korean is typical of languages with verb-final word order, such as Japanese, in that most affixes are suffixes and clitics are enclitics, modifiers precede the words they modify, and most elements of a phrase or clause are optional.

Compound sentence
A compound sentence is a sentence where two or more independent clauses are equally connected. The verb endings used for connecting the clauses include  -go "and",  -(eu)myeo "and",  -(eu)na "but", and  -jiman "but".

  "The winter is now gone and the spring has come back, but the weather here still remained cold."

Complex sentence
A complex sentence is a sentence where one or more dependent clauses are subordinatedly connected to the independent clause. A lot of endings are used to indicate a wide variety of meanings, making the clause suffixed by one of them subordinate to the other clause. The difference from an adverb clause is not very apparent.

{{lang|ko|길을 걷다가 문득 하늘을 보았더니 달이 참 아름답게 떠 있었다.|italic=unset}} "I was walking along the street when I suddenly stopped to look up at the sky; the moon was there which was truly beautiful."

 Noun clauses 
Followed by noun clause marker  -(eu)m or  -gi, a sentence can serve as a noun. The markers are attached to the last verb of the sentence.

Note that  -(eu)m is used in more formal settings, meanwhile  -gi is used casually.
  "I didn't know that he was already dead."
  "That she is the criminal is clear."
  "I don't feel like working."
  "vegetables chopped for the convenience of eating"

 Adjective clauses 
See Korean verbs.

 ? "Do you remember where we had chicken when we were in Seoul?"
  "My homeland where I lived was a mountain town in which flowers bloomed."

Accompanied by several dependent nouns, adjective clauses can comprise idiomatic expressions, such as  -l kkeos-ida for the future conjugation,  -l kkeot gatda, "I suppose...",  -l ssu(ga) itda/eopda "It is possible/impossible...",  -l liga eopda "It makes no sense that..."

  것이다. "He has never been late so far. Today, as usual, he'll be on time."

 Adverb clauses 
Endings like  -i,  -ge,  -dorok, and so forth derive adverbial clauses.  -i is not commonly used in making clauses except for  eops-i "without";  -ge is in common use in this sense instead.

 "He looked at me without a word."
  "Please bring a cup for me; I need some water."
  "children playing with fun"
  "See gold as if seeing a stone."

A lot of caution is needed when faced with  -ge hada and  -ge doeda, which may mean just "do -ly" and "become sth -ly", but also can make causative and passive verbs, respectively, which consist of main and supportive verbs.
  (causative) ↔  (adverbial; causative if intended)
  (passive) ↔  (adverbial; passive if intended)

 Verbal clauses 
Usually in the form {{lang|ko|무엇은 무엇이 어떻다|italic=unset}}, the whole clause serves as one adjective predicate. Just look at the examples.
  "A rabbit has big ears and a giraffe has a long neck.", or word-for-word, "A rabbit is big-eared, and a giraffe is long-necked."
  "Instant ramen is cheap and tasty but not healthy."
  "I like pears, but my friend appeared with apples."
It is also important to note that with this examples, the dictionary form of verbs are being used. When speaking to another person, take note of the language's honor system in order to show respect and use the correct verb forms. There is an honorification agreement with Korean's syntax system that must always be in mind when speaking to another. 

 Quotation clauses 
Although the example above  might be used in a novel, it is unbearably awkward to say in more-general situations. The particle  (i)rago is for direct quotation, and the verb endings like  -dago,  -(neu)nyago,  -rago, and  -jago are used for indirect quotation, for declarative, interrogative, imperative, and suggesting sentences respectively. Exceptionally, sentences employing a verbal particle  ida and an adjective  anida are suffixed with -rago in place of -dago for declarative ones.

  "What?" or "What did you say?"
  "The police announced that they are investigating the details."

The last syllable -go is often dropped. Furthermore, if the verb hada means 'to say' and is right next to the syllable -go, then  -go hada is abridged, becoming  -da, which of course can conjugate.

 
  "Do you remember what I said? You only got tired for nothing."

Subordinate clauses

Verbs can take conjunctive suffixes. These suffixes make subordinate clauses.

One very common suffix, -ko  -go, can be interpreted as a gerund if used by itself, or, with a subject of its own, as a subordinating conjunction. That is, mek.ko  meokgo means approximately "eating," koki lul mek.ko  gogireul meokgo means "eating meat," and nay ka koki lul mek.ko  nae-ga gogi-reul meog-go means "I eat meat and..." or "My eating meat."

Another suffix, somewhat similar in meaning, is se  -seo which is, however, attached to long stem of a verb.  The long stem of a verb is the one that is formed by attaching -  -eo/-a after a consonant.

Both sometimes called gerunds, the verb form that ends in se and the one that ends in -ko juxtapose two actions, the action in the subclause and the action in the main clause. The difference between them is that with se the action in the subclause necessarily came first, while -ko conveys more of an unordered juxtaposition. se is frequently used to imply causation, and is used in many common expressions like manna se pan.kapsupnita  Manna-seo bangapseumnida (literally, "Since I met you, I'm happy" -or- "Having met you, I'm happy"). If -ko was used instead, the meaning would be closer to "I meet you and I'm happy," that is, without any implied logical connection.

These are both subordinating conjunctive suffixes and cannot (in the more formal registers, at least) derive complete sentences of their own without the addition of a main verb, by default the verb iss .  (Nay ka koki lul mek.ko issta, naega gogireul meoggo issda) therefore means "I am eating meat." The difference between this and the simple sentence  (nay ka koki lul meknun ta, naega gogileul meogneunda, "I eat meat") is similar to the difference in Spanish between "Estoy almorzando" and "Almuerzo," in that the compound form emphasizes the continuity of the action. The -se  form is used with the existential verb iss  for the perfect.  (Mwuni yellye issta, mun-i yeollyeo issda, "the door has been opened") can be the example, although it would convey different meaning if the very syllable se were visible,  'because the door is opened, it exist', meaning of which is not clear, though.

Questions
Questions in Korean are formed using interrogatory verb endings such as  -(seu)mnikka. The verb ending usage varies according to the speech level.

Imperatives
Imperatives in Korean are formed using imperative verb endings such as  -(eu)sipsio. The verb ending usage varies according to the speech level.

Suggestions
Suggestions in Korean are formed using suggestion verb endings such as  -(eu)psida. The verb ending usage varies according to the speech level.

Exclamations
Exclamations in Korean are formed using exclamatory verb endings such as  -guna. The verb ending usage varies according to the speech level.

Negation
The negation in Korean can be expressed in the following three forms.

 Negation using  an,  ani,  -ji anta, and  -ji anihada
 This form of negation signifies the absence of volition. It may imply that the agent did not act even though the situation allowed to do so.
 Negation using  mot and  -ji motada
 This form of negation signifies the absence of ability. It may imply that the agent could not act even if the agent intended to do so.
 Negation using  -ji malda
 This form of negation is used for imperatives and suggestions.

In addition, the negation can be achieved through the use of verbs with negative meaning, such as  anida,  eopda, and  moreuda.

Tense and aspect
The tense and aspect can be expressed using a variety of non-terminal suffixes and special constructions. The tense is expressed differently when the verb is used at the end of the sentence and when it is used to modify other phrases.

In addition, the progressive aspect can be expressed using  -go itda and  -(neu)n jung-ida forms for procedural verbs. The perfect aspect can be expressed using  -a/eo itda form.

Number

Korean has general number. That is, a noun on its own is neither singular nor plural. It also has an optional plural marker - -deul, which is most likely to be used for definite and highly animate nouns (primarily first- and second-person pronouns, to a lesser extent nouns and third-person pronouns referring to humans, etc.) This is similar to several other languages with optional number, such as Japanese.

However, Korean -deul may also be found on the predicate, on the verb, object of the verb, or modifier of the object, in which case it forces a distributive plural reading (as opposed to a collective reading) and indicates that the word is attached to expresses new information.

For instance:

In this case, the information that the subject is plural is expressed.

To add a distributive meaning on a numeral,  ssik is used.

Now "balloon" is specified as a distributive plural.

Subject–verb agreement 
While it is usually stated that Korean does not have subject–verb agreement, the conjugated verbs do, in fact, show agreement with the logical subject (not necessarily the grammatical subject) in several ways. However, agreement in Korean usually only narrows down the range of subjects. Personal agreement is shown partly on the verb stem before the tense-aspect-mood suffixes, and partly on the sentence-final endings.

Korean distinguishes:
Honorific subjects from non-honorific subjects in the second or third person via a verb suffix. See Korean honorifics.
Korean distinguishes first person from non-first in emotion verbs, in that the form "" A dislikes B for example is hardly used for 3rd-person subjects in most registers, and only used inside questions in case of 2nd-person subjects.  (A prominent exception is in novels or stories, where it is understood that the narrator is omniscient and can authoritatively describe what's going on inside A's mind.)  On the contrary, the form "" can be used freely for 1st-, 2nd-, and 3rd-person subjects.
first person from third person, partially, in the future and the past tense. 
inclusive first person from exclusive first person, and first person from third person, in the jussive mood

Korean does not distinguish:
singular from plural on the verb (though this is systematically marked on pronouns)
second person from third person in statements
second person from first person in questions

The following table is meant to indicate how the verb stem and/or the sentence ending can vary depending on the subject. The column labeled "jussive ending" contains the various jussive sentences endings in the plain style.

Valency

Valency in Korean
 An intransitive verb, an adjective, or a noun plus the predicate particle 이다 -ida requests one argument, the subject, though it may be omitted. 
 "It is raining."
  "The sky is blue."
  "It is morning now."
 A transitive verb needs two arguments; one is the subjects, and the other can either be an object, a complement, or an essential adverb. 
  "A cat catches a mouse." (object)
  "He came to me and became a flower." (adverb, then complement)
 A ditransitive verb carries three arguments, which always include an essential adverb. 
  "I got 3 boxes of kimchi from my mom."
  "My brother told me "Everything's gonna be okay.""

See also
Korean postpositions
High-context and low-context cultures

References